This is a list of Season 11 episodes for Ice Road Truckers.  Season 11 premiered August 24, 2017 on History.

Episodes

Returning drivers 
Debogorski, Dewey, Burke and Custance continue driving for Polar, and Lisa continues to run the company she and Darrell Ward founded. Darrell's son Reno Ward (Season 8) joins the cast in episode 5, helping Lisa repay a debt to Polar owner Mark Kohaykewych. Mark also drives a pilot car for an oversized load hauled by Lisa and Reno (episodes 5 and 6).

Route and destinations 
Manitoba/Ontario ice roads: One new destination added in Season 11: Kasabonika, Ontario.

References 

2017 American television seasons
Ice Road Truckers seasons